Kim Do-yeon (June 6, 1894 – April 19, 1967) was a Korean independence activist and politician and member of the cabinet.

External links
 biography on the Ministry of Patriots and Veterans Affairs

1894 births
1967 deaths
Finance ministers of South Korea
Korean independence activists